X is the debut studio album from American music duo the Driver Era, released on June 28, 2019, by BMG.

Background
Brothers Rocky and Ross Lynch had previously been making music together for some time alongside their other siblings, as part of the now defunct pop rock band R5. On March 1, 2018, R5's Instagram and Twitter accounts were changed to the Driver Era, with all previous posts removed. The same day, the band released previews of their first single "Preacher Man", which was later released on March 16, 2018.

On August 24, 2018, the Driver Era released their next single, "Afterglow", first made available on their YouTube channel before eventually being put onto Spotify. Their third single, "Low", was released on October 26, 2018. 

On March 10, 2019, the Driver Era released a video titled "Haven't Left the Garage", which included snippets of several upcoming tracks from the album that they would perform on tour. The fourth single from the album, "Feel You Now", was released on March 29, 2019 after being previously teased, with a music video released three weeks later on April 17, 2019. The final single from the album, "Welcome to the End of Your Life", was released on April 26, 2019, with a music video released shortly after. 
On June 13, 2019, the Driver Era released a music video for the track "Low", as well as announcing the title of their debut studio album, X. The album was released on June 28, 2019.

An extended play featuring remixes of various tracks from the album, titled Some Remixes of X, was released on January 10, 2020.

Critical reception
X received generally positive reviews from music critics. Kelly McCafferty Dorogy, writing for Atwood Magazine, described the album as "a graduation from their early years in the mega pop group R5", finding the group's blending of soul, funk, pop, and rock genres as providing depth to each track. Honor Cockroft of The London Centrist compared the album to an "at-home concert", praising Rocky's production and Ross's vocal talent.

Track listing

References 

2019 debut albums
BMG Rights Management albums